Janda is an administrative ward in Buhigwe District  of Kigoma Region of Tanzania. In 2016 the Tanzania National Bureau of Statistics report there were 18,172 people in the ward, from 28,854 in 2012.

Villages / neighborhoods 
The ward has 4 villages and 16 hamlets.

 Janda 
 Butagara
 Kumsenga/nkona
 Janda Juu
 Janda Mbele
 Nyangamba/Kisovu
 Bukuba 
 Mwanaga ‘A’
 Mwanaga ‘B’
 Gwandamula
 Nkungwe ‘A’
 Nkungwe ‘B’
 Mahanga 
 Mkwanga
 Muvyilizi B
 Buzebazeba
 Muvyilizi
 Nyamihanga 
 Nyamihanga
 Mkipipi

References

Buhigwe District
Wards of Kigoma Region